SNNS (Stuttgart Neural Network Simulator) is a neural network simulator originally developed at the University of Stuttgart. While it was originally built for X11 under Unix, there are Windows ports. Its successor JavaNNS never reached the same popularity.

Features

SNNS is written around a simulation kernel to which user written activation functions, learning procedures and output functions can be added. It has support for arbitrary network topologies and the standard release contains support for a number of standard neural network architectures and training algorithms.

Status

There is currently no ongoing active development of SNNS. In July 2008 the license was changed to the GNU LGPL.

See also

 Artificial neural network
 Neural network software

External links
 SNNS homepage
 Patches with bugfixes and a Python interface to the SNNS kernel

Neural network software